KBFT may refer to:

 KBFT (FM), a radio station (89.9 FM) licensed to serve Nett Lake, Minnesota, United States
 KBFT (TV), a student television station in Sacramento, California, United States